CBC Windsor refers to:
CBEW-FM, CBC Radio One on 97.5 FM
CBE-FM, CBC Radio 2 on 89.9 FM
CBET-DT, CBC Television on channel 9

SRC Windsor refers to:
CBEF, Première Chaîne on 540 AM
CJBC-FM-1, Espace Musique on 103.9 FM, rebroadcasts CJBC-FM
CBEFT, Ici Radio-Canada Télé on channel 54, rebroadcasts CBLFT